The 1996 Giro d'Italia was the 79th edition of the Giro d'Italia, one of cycling's Grand Tours. The Giro began in Athens, Greece, with a flat stage on 18 May, and Stage 12 occurred on 29 May with a stage from Aulla. The race finished in Milan on 9 June.

Stage 12
30 May 1996 — Aulla to Loano,

Stage 13
31 May 1996 — Loano to Prato Nevoso,

Stage 14
1 June 1996 — Sanctuary of Vicoforte to Briançon,

Stage 15
2 June 1996 — Briançon to Aosta,

Stage 16
3 June 1996 — Aosta to Lausanne,

Stage 17
4 June 1996 — Lausanne to Biella,

Stage 18
5 June 1996 — Meda to Vicenza,

Stage 19
6 June 1996 — Vicenza to Marostica,  (ITT)

Stage 20
7 June 1996 — Marostica to Passo Pordoi,

Stage 21
8 June 1996 — Cavalese to Aprica,

Stage 22
9 June 1996 — Sondrio to Milan,

References

1996 Giro d'Italia
Giro d'Italia stages